The 2015 Scarborough Borough Council election took place on 7 May 2015 to elect members of the Scarborough Borough Council in England. It was held on the same day as other local elections.

Results summary

Ward results

Castle

Cayton

Central

Danby

Derwent Valley

 

 

 
Colin Challen was a sitting councillor for Castle ward.

Eastfield

Esk Valley

Falsgrave Park

Filey

Fylingdales

Hertford

Lindhead

Mayfield

Mulgrave

Newby

North Bay

Northstead

Ramshill

Scalby, Hackness and Staintondale

 
 

 
Subash Sharma was a sitting councillor for North Bay ward.

Seamer

Stepney

Streonshalh

Weaponness

Whitby West Cliff

Woodlands

Notes

References

2015 English local elections
May 2015 events in the United Kingdom
2015
2010s in North Yorkshire